This is a list of notable Ukrainian sportspeople.

American football
 Igor Olshansky - American football

Archery 

Nataliya Burdeyna – Olympic silver medalist
Dmytro Hrachov – Olympic bronze medalist
Viktor Ruban – Olympic champion
Olena Sadovnycha – Olympic silver medalist
Kateryna Serdyuk – Olympic silver medalist
Oleksandr Serdyuk – Olympic bronze medalist
Victor Sidoruk
Stanislav Zabrodsky

Athletics

Olena Antonova
Inha Babakova
Oleksandr Bagach
Bohdan Bondarenko
Yelyzaveta Bryzhina
Sergey Bubka – Olympic champion
Nataliya Dobrynska – Olympic champion
Olena Hovorova
Olena Krasovska – Olympic silver medalist
Inessa Kravets – Olympic champion
Oleksandr Krykun
Iryna Lishchynska
 Faina Melnik - 11 world records; Olympic discus throw champion
Nadiya Olizarenko
 Zhanna Pintusevich-Block, sprinter, world 100-m & 200-m champion
Olesya Povh
Oleksandr Pyatnytsya
Mariya Ryemyen
Olha Saladuha
Roman Shchurenko
Hrystyna Stuy
Vita Styopina
Tetyana Tereshchuk-Antipova
Nataliya Tobias
Denys Yurchenko

Baseball
Bill Cristall
Reuben Ewing
Izzy Goldstein

Basketball
Alexander Belostenny
Sergiy Gladyr
Natalya Klimova
Viacheslav Kravtsov
Raisa Kurvyakova
Alex Len
Slava Medvedenko
Oleksiy Pecherov
Anatoli Polivoda
Vitaly Potapenko
Lyudmila Rogozhina
 Anton Shoutvin 
Marina Tkachenko
Vladimir Tkachenko
Alexander Volkov
Tetiana Zakharova-Nadyrova

Biathlon

Olexander Bilanenko
Andriy Deryzemlya
Juliya Dzhyma – Olympic champion
Lilia Efremova – Olympic bronze medalist
 Pavlo Ishchenko - 2x European Amateur Boxing Championships medalist, and European Games medalist
Oksana Khvostenko
Nina Lemesh
Olena Petrova – Olympic silver medalist
Olena Pidhrushna – Olympic champion
Serguei Sednev
Serhiy Semenov
Valj Semerenko – Olympic champion
Vita Semerenko – Olympic champion
Valentina Tserbe-Nessina – Olympic bronze medalist
Tetyana Vodopyanova
Olena Zubrilova

Boxing
Denys Berinchyk
Serhiy Danylchenko
Serhiy Dotsenko – Olympic silver medalist
Andriy Fedchuk
Vyacheslav Glazkov
Oleksandr Hvozdyk
Oleg Kiryukhin
Vitali Klitschko – Professional boxer
Wladimir Klitschko – Olympic champion, professional boxer
Andreas Kotelnik – Olympic silver medalist
Ihor Korobchynskyi
Vasyl Lomachenko – Olympic champion
Grigory Misutin
Taras Shelestyuk
Volodymyr Sydorenko
Oleksandr Usyk – Olympic champion

Canoeing
Hanna Balabanova
Yuriy Cheban – Olympic champion
Olena Cherevatova
Inna Osypenko-Radomska – Olympic champion
Tetyana Semykina

Cycling
Yana Belomoyna
Serhiy Cherniavskiy
Oleksandr Fedenko
Lesya Kalytovska
Sergiy Matveyev
Hanna Solovey
Alexander Symonenko
Iryna Yanovych

Cross-country skiing
Alexander Batyuk
Valentina Shevchenko
Iryna Taranenko-Terelia

Diving
Illya Kvasha
Oleksiy Pryhorov
Ganna Sorokina
Olena Zhupina

Equestrian
Vera Misevich

Fencing
Vadim Gutzeit - Olympic champion
Olha Kharlan – Olympic champion
Olena Khomrova – Olympic champion
Halyna Pundyk – Olympic champion
Yana Shemyakina – Olympic champion
Vladyslav Tretiak
Olha Zhovnir – Olympic champion

Figure skating
Oksana Baiul – Olympic champion
 Alexei Beletski - Olympican
 Oleksii Bychenko - 2016 European silver medallist, Olympian
Elena Grushina – Olympic bronze medalist
Ruslan Goncharov – Olympic bronze medalist
 Natalia Gudina - Olympian
Viktor Petrenko – Olympic champion

Football
Yevhen Konoplyanka
Andriy Oberemko
Serhii Rebrov
Andriy Shevchenko
Anatoliy Tymoshchuk
Andriy Voronin

Freestyle skiing
Olha Volkova

Gymnastics
Alexander Beresch
Anna Bessonova
Nina Bocharova
Viktor Chukarin
 Olena Dvornichenko
Valeri Goncharov
Dmytro Leonkin
 Tatiana Lysenko - 2x Olympic champion 
 Valeria Maksyuta
Yuri Nikitin
 Katerina Pisetsky
Lilia Podkopayeva
Ihor Radivilov
Kateryna Serebrianska
Rustam Sharipov
Olena Vitrychenko
Oleksandr Vorobiov
Roman Zozulya

Handball
Anastasiia Pidpalova
Nataliya Borysenko
Ganna Burmystrova
Iryna Honcharova
Nataliya Lyapina
Galyna Markushevska
Olena Radchenko
Oxana Rayhel
Lyudmyla Shevchenko
Tetyana Shynkarenko
Ganna Siukalo
Olena Tsyhytsia
Maryna Vergelyuk
Olena Yatsenko
Larysa Zaspa

Ice hockey

 Ivan Pravilov (1963–2012), ice hockey coach, arrested for sexual abuse of teenage student, committed suicide by hanging in prison

Judo
Roman Hontyuk
Ruslan Mashurenko

Luge
Natalia Yakushenko

Modern pentathlon
Victoria Tereshchuk

Rowing
Serhiy Biloushchenko
Yana Dementyeva – Olympic champion
Nataliya Dovhodko – Olympic champion
Inna Frolova – Olympic silver medalist
Serhiy Hryn
Anastasiya Kozhenkova – Olympic champion
Oleh Lykov
Svitlana Maziy – Olympic silver medalist
Dina Miftakhutdynova – Olympic silver medalist
Olena Ronzhyna – Olympic silver medalist
Leonid Shaposhnykov
Kateryna Tarasenko – Olympic champion

Rugby league
 Ian Rubin

Sailing
Yevhen Braslavets – Olympic champion
Ganna Kalinina
George Leonchuk
Rodion Luka
Valentin Mankin – Olympic champion, only sailor in Olympic history to win gold medals in three different classes
Svitlana Matevusheva
Ihor Matviyenko – Olympic champion
Olena Pakholchyk
Ruslana Taran

Shooting
Artur Ayvazyan – Olympic champion
Mykola Milchev – Olympic champion
Olena Kostevych – Olympic champion
Oleksandr Petriv – Olympic champion
Jury Sukhorukov

Short track speed skating
Vladimir Grigorev

Speed skating
Oleg Goncharenko

Swimming
Olga Beresnyeva
Tatyana Devyatova
Sergey Fesenko, Sr. – Olympic champion
Yuriy Hromak
Pavlo Khnykin
Olga Kirichenko
Yana Klochkova – Olympic champion
Serhiy Krasyuk
Lenny Krayzelburg - 4x Olympic champion
Yelena Kruglova
Oleg Lisogor
 Maxim Podoprigora
Georgy Prokopenko – Olympic champion
Galina Prozumenshchikova – Olympic champion
Volodymyr Raskatov
Andriy Serdinov
Oleksandr Sydorenko – Olympic champion
Denys Sylantyev
Volodymyr Tkachenko
Marina Yurchenya

Table tennis
 Marina Kravchenko

Tennis
Alona Bondarenko
Kateryna Bondarenko
Alexandr Dolgopolov
Olga Fridman
Julia Glushko
Andriy Medvedev
Sergiy Stakhovsky
Elina Svitolina

Volleyball
Volodymyr Byelyayev
Volodymyr Ivanov
Valeriy Kryvov
Yevhen Lapinsky
Fedir Lashchonov
Viktor Mikhalchuk
Oleg Moliboga
Yury Panchenko
Anatoliy Polishchuk
Yuriy Poyarkov
Eduard Sibiryakov
Oleksandr Sorokalet
Borys Tereshchuk
Yury Vengerovsky

Water polo
Aleksei Barkalov
Viktor Berendyuga
Boris Goykhman
Andriy Kovalenko
Mikhail Ryzhak
Nikolai Smirnov
Dmitri Stratan
Vladimir Zhmudsky

Weightlifting
Nataliya Davydova
Denys Hotfrid
Yuliya Kalina
 Moisei Kas’ianik - world champion
Olha Korobka
Igor Olshanetskyi - Ukrainian-born Israeli Olympic weightlifter
Ihor Razoronov
 Igor Rybak - Olympic champion
Nataliya Skakun – Olympic champion
Timur Taymazov – Olympic champion
Oleksiy Torokhtiy – Olympic champion
Eduard Weitz - Ukrainian-born Israeli Olympic weightlifter

Wrestling
Valeriy Andriytsev
Yevhen Buslovych
Taras Danko
Vasyl Fedoryshyn
 Grigoriy Gamarnik - world champion
 Samuel Gerson - Olympic silver
Andriy Kalashnykov
Iryna Merleni – Olympic champion
Vyacheslav Oliynyk – Olympic champion
Yakiv Punkin
Davyd Saldadze
Andriy Stadnik
Elbrus Tedeyev – Olympic champion
Armen Vardanyan
 Nik Zagranitchni - Israeli Olympic wrestler
Zaza Zazirov

See also
Ukraine at the Olympics
Sport in Ukraine
List of people born in Ukraine

Ukrainian sportspeople